Walter Holscher (January 23, 1901 – August 7, 1973) was a German-born American art director. He was nominated for two Academy Awards in the category Best Art Direction.

Selected filmography
 Louisiana Hayride (1944)
 Rough, Tough and Ready (1945)
 The Woman from Tangier (1948)
 Thunderhoof (1948)
 The Wild One (1953)
 Reprisal! (1956)

Awards
Holscher was nominated for two Academy Awards for Best Art Direction:
 Address Unknown (1944)
 Pal Joey (1957)

References

External links

1901 births
1973 deaths
American art directors
German emigrants to the United States